"Au cœur de moi" is a song performed by French-Israeli singer Amir Haddad. The song was released as a digital download on 6 February 2017 as the fourth single from his second studio album Au cœur de moi (2016). The song has peaked at number 111 on the French Singles Chart, the song also charted in Belgium. The song was written by Amir Haddad, Nazim Khaled, Silvio Lisbonne and Manon Romiti.

Commercial performance
On 15 April 2017, the song entered the French Singles Chart at number 157, peaking at number 111 the following week.

Music video
A music video to accompany the release of "Au cœur de moi" was first released onto YouTube on 30 March 2017 at a total length of three minutes and ten seconds.

Track listing

Charts

Release history

References

2016 songs
2017 singles
Amir Haddad songs
Songs written by Nazim Khaled
Songs written by Silvio Lisbonne
Songs written by Manon Romiti
Warner Music Group singles
Songs written by Amir Haddad